Sherman Jarvis Jones (February 10, 1935 – February 21, 2007), nicknamed "Roadblock", was an American right-handed pitcher in Major League Baseball who went on to a career in Kansas politics.

Baseball Career
Born in Winton, North Carolina, Jones played from 1960 to 1962 for the San Francisco Giants, Cincinnati Reds and New York Mets. He appeared in Game 5 of the 1961 World Series for the Reds against the New York Yankees, retiring Clete Boyer and Bud Daley, the only two Yankees he faced. Jones posted a career record of two wins and six losses, with four saves, 53 strikeouts and a 4.73 earned run average in 48 games. His 12-year pro career extended from 1953 to 1958 and 1960–65; in addition to his time in the major leagues, Jones played in the minor leagues and in Venezuela.

Later Life and Politics
After leaving baseball, he served in the Kansas City Police Department for 22 years. Jones was later elected to the Kansas Legislature from Wyandotte County, serving in the House of Representatives from 1989 to 1992 and in the Senate from 1993 to 2000.

Personal life
Jones married Amelia Buchanan on December 16, 1956. He died at age 72 at the University of Kansas Medical Center.

References

External links
, or Retrosheet, or Venezuelan Professional Baseball League

1935 births
2007 deaths
African-American baseball players
Baseball players from North Carolina
Major League Baseball pitchers
Buffalo Bisons (minor league) players
Cincinnati Reds players
Danville Dans players
Danville Leafs players
Greenville Spinners players
Jersey City Jerseys players
Leones del Caracas players
Muskogee Giants players
Navegantes del Magallanes players
American expatriate baseball players in Venezuela
New York Mets players
People from Winton, North Carolina
Sportspeople from Kansas City, Kansas
Raleigh Mets players
St. Cloud Rox players
San Francisco Giants players
Sioux City Soos players
Syracuse Chiefs players
Tacoma Giants players
Topeka Hawks players
Toronto Maple Leafs (International League) players
Kansas state senators
Members of the Kansas House of Representatives
20th-century American politicians
20th-century African-American politicians
African-American state legislators in Kansas